Little Town is a historic home located near Littleton, Sussex County, Virginia.  It was built in 1811 in two sections.  It consists of a two-story, three bay, double-pile, side-hall-plan block attached to an original three-bay single cell parlor wing.  It has a gable roof with a modillion cornice and interior end chimneys.  Also on the property is a contributing frame dairy.

It was listed on the National Register of Historic Places in 1976.

References

Houses on the National Register of Historic Places in Virginia
Houses completed in 1811
National Register of Historic Places in Sussex County, Virginia
Houses in Sussex County, Virginia